Yenice (literally "new town," formerly also written Yenidje or Yenidze) may refer to:

Places

Turkey

Ankara Province
Yenice, Çubuk, a village in Çubuk district, Ankara Province
Yenice, Nallıhan, a village in Nallıhan district, Ankara Province
Yenice, Polatlı, a village in Polatlı district, Ankara Province
Yenice Dam, a dam in Turkey, near Yenice, Nallıhan
Sindiren, Haymana, formerly known as Yenice

Antalya Province
Yenice, Alanya, a village in Alanya district, Antalya Province
Yenice, Gündoğmuş, a village in Gündoğmuş district, Antalya Province

Aydın Province
Yenice, Bozdoğan, a village in Bozdoğan district, Aydın Province
Yenice, Karacasu, a village in Karacasu district, Aydın Province

Mersin Province
Yenice, Gülnar, a village in Gülnar district, Mersin Province
Yenice, Tarsus, a town in Mersin Province 
Yenice railway station, a railway station in Yenice, Mersin

Other provinces
Yenice, Akçakoca
Yenice, Adıyaman, a village in Adıyaman district, Adıyaman Province
Yenice, Ağaçören, a village in Ağaçören district, Aksaray Province
Yenice, Alaca
Yenice, Bandırma
Yenice, Bayramiç
Yenice, Bismil
Yenice, Büyükorhan
Yenice, Çanakkale, a district of Çanakkale Province
Yenice, Çorum
Yenice, Çüngüş
, a village in Dernekpazarı district, Trabzon Province
Yenice, Dikili, a village in Dikili district, İzmir Province
Yenice, Gercüş, a village in Gercüş district, Batman Province
Yenice, Giresun, a town in Giresun Province
Yenice, İhsaniye, a village in İhsaniye district, Afyonkarahisar Province
Yenice, İskilip
Yenice, Karakoçan
Yenice, Karabük, a district of Karabük Province 
Yenice, Karataş, a village in Karataş district, Adana Province
Yenice, Lapseki
Yenice, Merzifon, a village in Merzifon district, Amasya Province
Yenice, Orta
 , a village in Pınarhisar district, Kırklareli Province
Yenice, Sur
, a village in Yağlıdere District, Giresun Province
Yeniceköy, Bursa, a town in Bursa Province
 Yenice, Yaprakli is a village in Yaprakli district of Çankiri province
Yenice, Yapraklı

Greece
Giannitsa, Pella regional unit,  formerly Γενιτσά, Yenice, or Vardar Yenicesi
Genisea, Xanthi regional unit, formerly Yenice/Yenidje/Yenidze or Yenice Karasu, and famous for its tobacco
 Dovras, Imathia, whose community Agios Georgios was formerly named Γιάννισσα/Γιάννισα
Vasiliko, Ioannina (formerly Γιάννιστα), Ioannina regional unit

Azerbaijan
Yenicə, Agdash
Yenicə, Yevlakh

Other uses
Yenice Conference, a meeting between Turkish President İsmet İnönü and British Prime Minister Winston Churchill during World War II, near Yenice, Tarsus
Battle of Yenidje between the Greek and Ottoman Armies, near Giannitsa, Pella, during the First Balkan War (1912)
Yenidze, a former cigarette factory in Dresden, Germany
Yenidje Tobacco Company Limited, a former U.K. tobacco company